Hormurus ischnoryctes is a species of scorpion in the Hormuridae family. It is native to Australia, where it has only been found in north-eastern Queensland. It was first described in 2013.

Etymology
The specific epithet ischnoryctes comes from the Greek ischnos (‘lean’ or ‘thin’) and oryktes (‘digger’), with reference to the slender pincers of the male.

Description
The species grows up to about 60 mm in length. Colouration is orange- to reddish-brown to dark brown. The pincers of the female are slightly shorter and more robust than those of the male.

Distribution and habitat
Specimens of the species were collected near Mount Mulligan, west of Mareeba and the Atherton Tableland, in savanna woodland containing patches of vine thicket, at the base of the large sandstone Ngarrabullgan mesa which provides orographic moisture to its surrounds.

Behaviour
The scorpions dig vertical burrows up to 30 cm deep, with a terminal chamber and slit entrance. They also shelter in rock crevices and beneath stones in the vicinity of creeks and pools.

References

 

 
ischnoryctes
Scorpions of Australia
Endemic fauna of Australia
Fauna of Queensland
Animals described in 2013